De Agostini  is a surname of Italian origin. Notable people with the surname include:

 Alberto María de Agostini, an Italian missionary, explorer and geographer
 Giovanni Maria de Agostini, a lay monk of Italian origin who travelled widely in South and North America
 Luigi De Agostini, an Italian footballer
 Doris de Agostini, a Swiss skier
 Virginia De Agostini, international figure skating judge for the International Skating Union

See also
 De Agostini (disambiguation)
 Agostini

Surnames of Italian origin